Johann Alexander Döderlein (February 11, 1675 - October 23, 1745) was a German historian, philologist and numismatist.
He studied at University of Altdorf near Nuremberg. He was polymath and his field of work included archaeology, classical studies, meteorology, and regional history. Döderlein was a member of the Prussian Academy of Sciences and of the German Academy of Sciences Leopoldina. He was rector of the Alte Lateinschule, the former school of Weißenburg am Sand.

External links 

1675 births
1745 deaths
Academic staff of the University of Altdorf
18th-century German historians